Highway 249 (AR 249, Ark. 249, and Hwy. 249) is a north–south state highway in Prairie County, Arkansas. The highway begins in Hazen and runs north through the central part of the county. The route is maintained by the Arkansas Department of Transportation (ArDOT).

Route description
Highway 249 begins at U.S. Route 70 (US 70, South Front Street) in Hazen, a small city in the Grand Prairie ecoregion. The southern terminus is near the Railroad Prairie Natural Area, a former railroad right-of-way traveling through downtown Hazen that has been preserved by the Arkansas Natural Heritage Commission. It travels due north as a section line road, briefly traveling along the Hazen city limits. North of Hazen, the highway travels through a rural, agricultural, and aquaculture area, with a bridge over Hurricane Creek and an overpass over Interstate 40 (I-40), though no access is provided. North of I-40, AR 249 travels through Center Point and Tarnceville, two unincorporated communities, before an intersection with AR 302. Highway 249 turns east, with Highway 302 running west from the intersection. Continuing east, Highway 249 passes the Prairie County Fairgrounds before terminating at a junction with Highway 11 near the Wattensaw Wildlife Management Area.

Major intersections

History
The highway was designated on July 10, 1957, by the Arkansas State Highway Commission. It was extended east to Highway 11 on June 29, 1960.

See also

References

External links

249
Transportation in Prairie County, Arkansas